Lagesen is a Norwegian surname. Notable people with the surname include:

Alf Lagesen (1897–1973), Norwegian footballer
Kai Lagesen (born 1965), Norwegian footballer
Ruth Lagesen (1914–2005), Norwegian pianist and conductor

Norwegian-language surnames